The Royal Air Force Legal Branch (RAFLB) or Directorate Legal Services (DLS) - as it is better known - is the uniformed legal service provider for the Royal Air Force. It consists of solicitors and barristers qualified in a Commonwealth jurisdiction. DLS is headquartered at Air Command RAF High Wycombe. The Directorate is currently staffed by a mixture of members of:
The Law Society of England and Wales;
The Law Society of Scotland;
The Bar Council of England and Wales; and
The Society of Writers to Her Majesty's Signet.

History

The RAF Legal Branch was formed on 1 October 1948. Its predecessor was the Air Force Department of the Office of Judge Advocate General.

Role

It is open to men or women; those that have been recruited vary from NQ to 10 years PQE. DLS has around 50 legal officers. Around 30% of DLS officers are based in overseas billets. The type of work undertaken by legal officers depends on the billet they are working at. Around 50% of the billets are discipline / criminal law, 30% of the billets are operations law and 20% of the billets are administrative law.
The RAF also provides 4 Legal Officers to the Service Prosecuting Authority.

Career

The career structure of a legal officer within DLS would commence with a short service commission as a Flight Lieutenant after a 3-month SERE course at RAF Cranwell. If the candidate is suitable then appointment to a permanent commission and subsequent promotion will be by selection.

Directors of Legal Services (RAF)

The head of the RAF Legal Branch is titled the Director of Legal Services RAF. The current holder is Air Vice Marshal T N Jennings.

 Air Commodore John Bankes Walmsley (1950 - 1957)
 Air Commodore Marshall William Palmer (1957 - 1961)
 Air Vice-Marshal John Ernest Allen-Jones (1961 - 1970)
 Air Vice-Marshal Aubrey Sidney-Wilmot (1970 - 1978)
 Air Vice-Marshal Peter Furniss (December 1978 to April 1982)
 Air Vice-Marshal Graham Neil Forman (1982 - 1989)
 Air Vice-Marshal Reginald Thomas Dawson (1989 - 1992)
 Air Vice-Marshal Geoffrey W Carleton (1993 - 1997)
 Air Vice-Marshal John Weeden (1997 - 2002)
 Air Vice-Marshal Richard Anthony Charles (2002 - 2009)
 Air Vice Marshal Lindsay J Irvine (April 2009 to April 2017)
 Air Vice Marshal Alison Mardell (April 2017 to 29 September 2018)
 Air Vice Marshal Tamara Jennings (29 September 2018 to present)

Deputy Directors
 Air Commodore Lindsay Irvine (2002 to April 2009)
 Air Commodore William H Boothby (April 2009 to July 2011)
 Air Commodore S J Kell (July 2011 to July 2014)
 Air Commodore Alison Mardell (2014 to 2017)
 Air Commodore T N Jennings (2017 to 2018)
 Air Commodore K J Sanders (2018 to present)

References

External links
 Home page of the RAF Legal Branch

Royal Air Force
Military units and formations established in 1948
Organisations based in Buckinghamshire
United Kingdom military law
United Kingdom